Composition 113 is a solo album by composer Anthony Braxton featuring his title piece, for one soloist, a large photograph, and prepared stage, which was released on the Sound Aspects label in 1984.

Reception

The Allmusic review by Brian Olewnick stated "Composition 113 is not nearly as forbidding or difficult as one might guess at first blush, given its ascetic instrumentation. Braxton's tone is rich and luscious throughout and he freely draws on both blues and romanticism, making this one of his more accessible solo forays. Highly recommended".

Track listing
All compositions by Anthony Braxton
 "Composition 113 (For One Soloist, A Large Photograph, And Prepared Stage)":	
 "Section 1" – 7:47
 "Section 2" – 7:27
 "Section 3" – 5:07
 "Section 4" – 6:47
 "Section 5" – 5:35
 "Section 6" – 4:45

Personnel
 Anthony Braxton – E♭ soprano saxophone

References

Anthony Braxton albums
1984 albums